Montpelier is a village located in Saint James Parish, Jamaica, approximately 15 minutes away from the parish's capital Montego Bay.

Landmarks 
Montpelier railway station : Opened in 1895 and closed in 1992. It served the village of Montpelier on the Kingston to Montego Bay line and was 103 miles (166 km) from the Kingston terminus. It is on the list of designated National Heritage Sites in Jamaica.                                                                        
Express Plaza: A small plaza that is located in the guinep Tree area. It is owned by retired businessman Lyliod Thompson  "Express." It was built in the late eighties.

References

Populated places in Saint James Parish, Jamaica